San Francisco del Valle is a municipality in the Honduran department of Ocotepeque.

Demographics
At the time of the 2013 Honduras census, San Francisco del Valle municipality had a population of 9,625. Of these, 86.61% were Mestizo, 10.00% White, 2.68% Indigenous (2.46% Chʼortiʼ), 0.58% Black or Afro-Honduran and 0.14% others.

References

Municipalities of the Ocotepeque Department